Ethan McIlroy (born 10 August 2000) is an Irish rugby union player who plays wing or fullback for Ulster in the United Rugby Championship and the European Rugby Champions Cup.

He attended Methodist College Belfast, playing fullback in the Methody team that defeated Campbell College 45–17 in the Ulster Schools' Cup final in 2019. He made his debut for Ulster against Leinster in December 2019, while still in the province's sub-academy. He made two starts for Ireland in the 2020 Six Nations Under 20s Championship. He was named Ulster "A" Player of the Year in the 2020 Ulster Rugby Awards. He signed an academy contract for the 2020–21 season, and, alongside David McCann, was awarded the Jack Kyle Bursary by the Ulster Rugby Supporters Club. That season he made 14 senior appearances, including seven starts, and scored two tries.

He signed a development contract ahead of the 2021–22 season, during which, mainly playing on the wing, he made 22 appearances including 21 starts, and scored five tries, including two in Ulster's Champions Cup round of 16 defeat to Toulouse. Rugby Pass named him as one of the URC's breakout stars of the season, and he won Ulster's Young Player of the Year award. He was selected for the Emerging Ireland squad for the Toyota Challenge in South Africa in September 2022.

References

External links
Ulster Rugby profile
United Rugby Championship profile

2000 births
Living people
Irish rugby union players
Ulster Rugby players
Rugby union wings
Rugby union fullbacks